Retiro Copihue Airport is an airport  south of Retiro, near the village of Copihue in the Maule Region of Chile.

See also

Transport in Chile
List of airports in Chile

References

External links
OpenStreetMap - Copihue
OurAirports - Copihue
FallingRain - Copihue Airport

Airports in Chile
Airports in Maule Region